In October 1982, a representative team of Sri Lankan cricket players undertook a so-called "Rebel tour" to South Africa, to play a series of matches against the South African team colloquially called the 'cuckoo tour'. At the time, the International Cricket Council (ICC) had placed a moratorium on international cricket teams making tours of South Africa, due to the nation's government policy of apartheid, leaving South Africa with no international competition.

Background
During the 1970s and 1980s, due to the boycott of South Africa by global sporting bodies, the International Cricket Council blocked any official cricket tours to South Africa. This led to a number of so-called "rebel" tours, where individual players were contracted to tour as part of unofficial representative teams. The first such tour recently took place with an English team touring the country.

Heads of the South African Cricket Union, Ali Bacher and Geoff Dakin, approached Sri Lankan cricketer Tony Opatha in July 1982 to negotiate organising a tour by Sri Lankan players. In September Colin Rushmere, a South African lawyer, flew to Colombo with 14 contracts for the players of a team Opatha had assembled in secret. A month later the Sri Lankan team was touring Zimbabwe and Rushmere visited Harare to confirm the participation of Roy Dias and Duleep Mendis. However both were unable to join the tour team to South Africa as their passports were held by the team manager. When news of the tour broke, the Board of Cricket Control for Sri Lanka (BCCSL) issued 25-year bans to all the tour players. Opatha, who was team manager as well as a player, named the team the 'AROSA Sri Lankan XI'. The 'ARO' standing for the first three initials in his name; Antony Ralph Opatha and the 'SA' standing for South Africa.

Sri Lanka were still an emerging team at the time, having only been granted Test status earlier in 1982, and were not regarded as being in the same league as the South Africans. The tour of a Sri Lankan team, the first ever by a non-white team, was a milestone which showed the world that South Africa (who previously blocked an English team touring in 1968 for containing just one non-white player) was reforming.

The tour
The tour was a disaster for the AROSA Sri Lankan team, failing to win a single game. They were soundly beaten in all their one-day and "test" matches against the South Africans. Sri Lankan managed only to draw three matches against provincial teams, with the remainder also being defeats. The team was not helped by the absence of stronger preforming players like Dias and Mendis and the underperformance of star spin bowler Ajit de Silva who struggled with stress and had a breakdown on tour.

First ODI

Second ODI

Third ODI

First Test

Fourth ODI

Second Test

Aftermath
The 14 players were given a 25-year ban, depriving Sri Lankan cricket of a large amount of player talent. Despite earning enough money from the tour to settle down and build houses, most faced social stigma and unemployment afterwards. In 1991 Sri Lankan president Ranasinghe Premadasa lifted the bans on the players allowing many of the rebels to later hold key positions in cricket administration. One player, Flavian Aponso, did play international cricket again at the 1996 Cricket World Cup for the Netherlands (where he had moved after the rebel tour). The Sri Lankan tour is theorised to have helped pave the way for subsequent rebel tours of players from the West Indies a few years later by demonstrating it possible for a non-white cricket team to tour South Africa safely.

References

Further reading
Peter May, The Rebel Tours: Cricket's Crisis of Conscience, SportsBooks, 2009.

External links
Arosa Sri Lanka tour of South Africa 1982/83 at Cricinfo

Sri Lankan cricket tours of South Africa
Sri Lanka in international cricket
Cricket and apartheid
Cricket controversies
1982 in cricket